Fabián Enrique Muñoz Hormazábal (born December 20, 1978 in San Miguel, Santiago, Chile) is a Chilean former footballer who played as a forward.

Teams

  Cobreloa 1997                          
  Barnechea 1998                        
  Colo-Colo Juniors 1999                   
  Unión La Calera 2000                                 
  Deportes Melipilla 2001                              
  Unión San Felipe 2002-2003                           
  Santiago Wanderers 2003                              
  Deportes Concepción 2004 
  Deportes Arica 2005-2006         
  Deportivo Zacapa 2006–2007                           
  Fernández Vial 2007       
  Comunicaciones 2007-2008          
  Deportivo Zacapa 2008-2009                           
  Coban Imperial 2009-2010                             
  Universidad San Carlos 2010           
  San Marcos 2011–2012

Titles
  San Marcos 2012 Primera B de Chile

External links
 
 
 Fabián Muñoz at MemoriaWanderers 

1978 births
Living people
Footballers from Santiago
Chilean footballers
Chilean expatriate footballers
Cobreloa footballers
A.C. Barnechea footballers
Colo-Colo B footballers
Unión La Calera footballers
Deportes Melipilla footballers
Unión San Felipe footballers
Santiago Wanderers footballers
Deportes Concepción (Chile) footballers
San Marcos de Arica footballers
Deportivo Zacapa players
C.D. Arturo Fernández Vial footballers
Comunicaciones F.C. players
Cobán Imperial players
Universidad de San Carlos players
Chilean expatriate sportspeople in Guatemala
Expatriate footballers in Guatemala
Tercera División de Chile players
Primera B de Chile players
Chilean Primera División players
Liga Nacional de Fútbol de Guatemala players
Association football forwards
People from Santiago Province, Chile